The 2020 Individual Speedway Under 21 World Championship was the 44th edition of the FIM Individual Under-21 World Championship. It was staged over one round only, at Pardubice in the Czech Republic, on 2 October. The competition was reduced from three rounds to just one because of the COVID-19 pandemic. The title was won by Australian Jaimon Lidsey.

Final 
Pardubice, Czech Republic, on 2 October

See also 
 2020 Speedway Grand Prix
 2020 Team Speedway Junior World Championship

References 

 
2020
Individual Speedway Junior World Championship